Falls City is a city in Polk County, Oregon, United States. The population was 1,051 at the 2020 census. It is part of the Salem Metropolitan Statistical Area.

History

It is part of the Dallas micropolitan statistical area. Falls City is named after a waterfall in the Little Luckiamute River that passes through the center of town.  In the past it was a lumbermill town and once had three mills in operation, a bank, hotel, soda shop, jail, and several grocery stores and bars. It formerly supported a large logging population and other population centers in the hills of the Coast Range, such as the smaller lumber-based community of Black Rock and the company-owned mill town Valsetz.

Geography

Climate
The city of Falls City experiences warm and dry summers, and cold and wet winters, with no average monthly temperatures above . According to the Köppen Climate Classification, Falls City has a warm-summer Mediterranean climate, abbreviated Csb on climate maps.

Demographics

2010 census
As of the census of 2010, there were 947 people, 366 households, and 261 families residing in the city. The racial makeup of the city was 91.6% White, 0.1% African American, 2.3% Native American, 0.4% Asian, 0.1% Pacific Islander, 1.8% from other races, and 3.7% from two or more races. Hispanic or Latino of any race were 5.2% of the population.

There were 366 households, of which 30.3% had children under the age of 18 living with them, 54.4% were married couples living together, 10.4% had a female householder with no husband present, 6.6% had a male householder with no wife present, and 28.7% were non-families. 22.7% of all households were made up of individuals, and 7.6% had someone living alone who was 65 years of age or older. The average household size was 2.59 and the average family size was 2.98.

The median age in the city was 43.5 years. 22.9% of residents were under the age of 18; 8% were between the ages of 18 and 24; 21% were from 25 to 44; 31.9% were from 45 to 64; and 16.3% were 65 years of age or older. The gender makeup of the city was 51.5% male and 48.5% female.

2000 census
As of the census of 2000, there were 966 people, 338 households, and 255 families residing in the city. The population density was 785.2 people per square mile (303.2/km2). There were 373 housing units at an average density of 303.2 per square mile (117.1/km2). The racial makeup of the city was 92.86% White, 0.93% African American, 1.66% Native American, 0.10% Asian, 0.21% Pacific Islander, 1.04% from other races, and 3.21% from two or more races. Hispanic or Latino of any race were 3.62% of the population.

There were 338 households, out of which 35.2% had children under the age of 18 living with them, 58.3% were married couples living together, 13.6% had a female householder with no husband present, and 24.3% were non-families. 19.2% of all households were made up of individuals, and 9.5% had someone living alone who was 65 years of age or older. The average household size was 2.86 and the average family size was 3.25.

In the city, the population was spread out, with 31.0% under the age of 18, 5.5% from 18 to 24, 26.7% from 25 to 44, 22.4% from 45 to 64, and 14.5% who were 65 years of age or older. The median age was 38 years. For every 100 females, there were 91.7 males. For every 100 females age 18 and over, there were 88.4 males.

The median income for a household in the city was $32,461, and the median income for a family was $36,528. Males had a median income of $31,827 versus $26,429 for females. The per capita income for the city was $13,858. About 11.6% of families and 15.8% of the population were below the poverty line, including 16.5% of those under age 18 and 9.0% of those age 65 or over.

References

External links

 Entry for Falls City in the Oregon Blue Book

Cities in Oregon
Cities in Polk County, Oregon
Salem, Oregon metropolitan area
1893 establishments in Oregon
Populated places established in 1893
Logging communities in the United States